Oleacina guadeloupensis was a species of air-breathing land snail, a terrestrial pulmonate gastropod mollusk in the family Oleacinidae. It is now extinct.

Distribution
This species was endemic to the island of Guadeloupe in the West Indies.

References

Oleacinidae
Extinct gastropods
Gastropods described in 1856
Taxonomy articles created by Polbot